Backstreet Dreams is the eighth album by Blue System. It was released in 1993 by BMG Ariola and produced by Dieter Bohlen. The album contains 11 new tracks.

Track listing
All tracks by Dieter Bohlen

Personnel
 Dieter Bohlen – lead vocals, chorus, producer, arranger, lyrics
 Rolf Köhler – refrain vocals, chorus, bass, drums
 Detlef Wiedeke – chorus, guitar
 Michael Scholz – chorus, keyboards
 Luis Rodriguez – co-producer

Charts

Weekly charts

Year-end charts

References

External links

Blue System albums
1993 albums
Bertelsmann Music Group albums